Utaridi Planitia is a large plain in the southern hemisphere of Mercury.  Most of it is in the Debussy quadrangle, but it extends to the east into Neruda quadrangle and to the south into Bach quadrangle.  The plain was named by the IAU in 2017.

The large crater Alver lies in southern Utaridi Planitia.  The Rembrandt basin lies to the north of it.

References

Surface features of Mercury